Ruslan Mashurenko (born March 13, 1971) is a Ukrainian judoka. He won a bronze medal in the middleweight (90 kg) division at the 2000 Summer Olympics, honorary president of Odesa Region Judo Federation.

Achievements

References

External links
 
 
 

1971 births
Living people
Ukrainian male judoka
Judoka at the 1996 Summer Olympics
Judoka at the 2000 Summer Olympics
Olympic judoka of Ukraine
Olympic bronze medalists for Ukraine
Olympic medalists in judo
Medalists at the 2000 Summer Olympics
20th-century Ukrainian people
21st-century Ukrainian people